is a Japanese actor and tarento. He is often credited as BoBA.

Career
Born in Kiso, Nagano, Tanaka first began working for Japan National Railways after high school, but often went to the movies, including shows of indie and self-produced films. Becoming friends with young directors like Naoto Yamakawa, he left his job in 1990 and went to Tokyo, where he began working as an extra or lighting assistant on films by Naoto Takenaka, Junji Sakamoto, and others. After 1994 he concentrated on acting, eventually achieving fame in dramas like Hero. His first television show in a starring role, Outdoor Rock'n Roll, started broadcasting on BS Asahi in 2014.

Filmography

Film
 I Like You, I Like You Very Much (1994)
 Blissful Genuine Sex: Penetration! (1995)
 My Secret Cache (1997)
 Shark Skin Man and Peach Hip Girl (1999)
 First Love (2000)
 Kakashi (2001)
 Ju-On: The Grudge (2002)
 Last Life in the Universe (2003)
 Kill Bill Vol. 1 (2003) - Crazy 88 #2
 All About My Dog (2004)
 The Hotel Venus (2004)
 Deep Sea Monster Reigo (2005)
 Death Note (2006)
 Sukiyaki Western Django (2007)
 L: Change the World (2008)
 Gokudō Meshi (2011)
 Homeland (2014)
 Tantei wa, Konya mo Yūutsuna Yume o Miru (2017)
 Kodoku: Meatball machine (2017)
 I Love Irene (2018)
 Blood - Club Dolls (2018)
 The Nikaidos' Fall (2019)
 Good-Bye (2020)
 Ura Aka: L'Aventure (2020)
 Kanemasa (2020)
 The Grapes of Joy (2021)
 Your Turn to Kill: The Movie (2021)
 Ring Wandering (2022)
 What to Do with the Dead Kaiju? (2022), the Chief of Staff, Joint Staff
 The Broken Commandment (2022)
 Sun and Bolero (2022), Masamichi Endo
 Haw (2022)
 Thousand and One Nights (2022)

Television
 Hero (2001)
 Kōshōnin (2003)
 Jun and Ai (2012–2013)
 Mischievous Kiss: Love in Tokyo (2013)
 Akagi (2015) – Takeshi Ōgi 
 Burning Flower (2015) - Fukugawa Sainosuke
 Naotora: The Lady Warlord (2017) - Anayama Nobutada
 Ten: Tenhō-dōri no Kaidanji (2018) – Ginji Asai
 Ten: Akagi Shigeru Sōshiki-hen (2019) – Ginji Asai
 Your Turn to Kill (2019)
 The Supporting Actors 3 (2021) - Himself
 Reach Beyond the Blue Sky (2021) - Hagiwara Shirobei
 A Day-Off of Ryunosuke Kamiki (2022)

Video games
 428: Shibuya Scramble (2008)

References

External links
 
 
 
 
 

Japanese male actors
1963 births
Living people
People from Nagano Prefecture